The mosaic desert skink (Eremiascincus musivus) is a species of skink found in Western Australia.

References

Eremiascincus
Reptiles described in 2009
Taxa named by Sven Mecke
Taxa named by Paul Doughty
Taxa named by Steve Donnellan (scientist)